Never may refer to:

Songs
"Never" (Heart song), 1985
"Never" (Jaheim song), 2008
"Never" (Keyshia Cole song), 2005
"Never" (Kristine W song), 2008
"Never" (Moving Pictures song), 1984
"Never" (Ozzy Osbourne song), 1986
"Never (Past Tense)", a 2003 song by the Roc Project and Tina Arena
"Never" (Produce 101 song), song by the contestants of Produce 101 Season 2
"Never", by Electrafixion from the 1995 album Burned
"Never", by Flo Rida from his 2009 album R.O.O.T.S.
"Never", by The House of Love from the 1990 album The House of Love
"Never", by Jomanda, 1993
"Never", by Marcus & Martinus from the 2017 album Moments
"Never", by Moby Grape from the 1968 album Wow/Grape Jam, with lyrics later used by Led Zeppelin in “Since I’ve Been Loving You”
"Never", by Sevendust from the 2005 album Next

Places
Never, Amur Oblast, a rural locality on the A360 Lena Highway
Never, a crater on Mars
Nevers, a commune in central France
Neverland, a fictional place where you never grow up.

Other uses
NEVER (professional wrestling), a series of professional wrestling events held by New Japan Pro Wrestling
Never (Micachu and the Shapes album), 2012
Never (Mie album)
Never (film), 2014 drama written and directed by Brett Allen Smith

See also

Nevers (disambiguation)
Never Say Goodbye (disambiguation)
Never Say Never (disambiguation)
Never Surrender (disambiguation)
Never Too Much (disambiguation)
Nevermore (disambiguation)
Never Never (disambiguation)
Never Never Never, a 1973 album by Shirley Bassey